Ginataan, alternatively spelled guinataan, is a Filipino term which refers to food cooked with gatâ (coconut milk). Literally translated, ginataan means "done with coconut milk". Due to the general nature of the term, it can refer to a number of different dishes, each called ginataan, but distinct from one another.

During the Spanish colonial era, the ginataan was brought to Mexico through the Manila galleons that docked in Acapulco. Today, it has become naturalized on the Guerrero coast, like the zambaripao or the tuba. In Spanish it is called guinatán.

Terminology
Ginataan usually refers to dishes which are eaten with rice during the major meals of the day. It normally follows the form "ginataan na/ginataang + (whatever it is cooked with)" or "(dish name) + sa gatâ". For example, ginataang hipon refers to shrimp cooked in coconut milk, ginataang gulay to an assortment of vegetables cooked in coconut milk, ginataang alimango is mud crabs cooked in coconut milk, while ginataang manok is chicken cooked in coconut milk. Coconut milk can also be added to existing dishes, as in ginataang adobo (known more commonly in Tagalog as adobo sa gatâ).

There are other dishes that are known by their own unique names, such as Bicol Express, laing and variants of pinakbet, which nonetheless fall under the ginataan category because they use coconut milk as one of the main ingredients.

Sweet variants

Various sweet desserts may also simply be called ginataan, especially in the northern Philippines. For example, the Visayan binignit, a soup made with coconut milk, glutinous rice, tubers, tapioca pearls, and sago is simply called ginataan in Tagalog (a shortened form of the proper name, ginataang halo-halo). This soup is also called "giná-tan" in Bikolano, "ginettaán" in Ilokano, and "ginat-ang lugaw" in Hiligaynon. If gummy balls made of pounded glutinous rice are used instead of plain glutinous rice, it becomes a dish called ginataang bilo-bilo or simply bilo-bilo. Ginataang mais is another example of a dessert soup; a warm, sweet, thick gruel made with coconut milk, sweet corn and glutinous rice.

List of ginataan dishes
Dishes considered under the ginataan category include the following:

Main dishes

Adobo sa gata
Curacha Alavar
Ginataang ampalaya
Ginataang isda
Ginataang kalabasa
Ginataang kuhol
Ginataang labong
Ginataang langka
Ginataang manok
Ginataang ubod
Ginisang munggo sa gata
Gising-gising (Ginataang sigarilyas)
Inubarang manok
Inulukan
Kinilaw
Kulawo
Laing
Linarang
Piaparan
Pininyahang hipon
Pininyahang manok
Piyanggang manok
Rendang
Sinanglay
Sinantolan
Sinilihan (Bicol Express)
Sorol
Tinumok
Tiyula itum

Dessert
Bilo-bilo
Binignit
Ginataang mais
Ginataang munggo
Ginataang saba
Pinakro

See also

List of dishes using coconut milk
Coconut soup
List of soups

References

Philippine soups
Cold soups
Foods containing coconut
Philippine desserts